Canada competed at the 2018 Winter Paralympics in Pyeongchang, South Korea, from 9 to 18 March 2018. Canada sent a team of 55 athletes to compete in all six sports. The chef de mission was retired sledge hockey player Todd Nicholson, appointed in January 2017.

Canada finished the Games with eight gold medals and 28 overall (ranking 3rd and 2nd, respectively). It was the most successful Canadian performance in terms of total medals, surpassing the 19 won at the 2010 Winter Paralympics. This also met the goal set by the Canadian Paralympic Committee to improve on the 16 medals won at the 2014 Winter Paralympics.

Opening ceremony flag-bearer Brian McKeever became Canada's most decorated Winter Paralympian after winning his 14th career medal at the Games, surpassing the previous record by Lana Spreeman, who won 13 medals between 1980 and 1994. He finished the Games with three gold and a bronze, for a career total of 13 gold medals and 17 medals in all, making him also the most decorated Paralympic cross-country skier ever.

Mark Arendz won a Canadian single Games record 6 medals (5 individual and a team relay medal), and was honoured as Canada's flag-bearer for the Games closing ceremony.

Medalists

| width="78%" align="left" valign="top" |

| width="22%" align="left" valign="top" |

Competitors
The following is the list of number of competitors participating at the Games per sport/discipline.

Alpine skiing

On 16 February 2018, Alpine Canada announced the nominations of 12 athletes (seven men and five women) to Team Canada.

Men

Women

Biathlon

Men

Women

Cross-country skiing

On 16 February 2018, Cross Country Canada announced the 14 athletes (ten men and four women) nominated to Team Canada. The team is expected to consist of 12 skiers and two guides including returning medallists Mark Arendz, Chris Klebl, and Brian McKeever with his guides Graham Nishikawa and Russell Kennedy. Kennedy competed in cross-country skiing at the 2018 Winter Olympics. Cindy Ouellet was part of Team Canada at the Summer Paralympics, where she played wheelchair basketball. It will also be the first Games for Collin Cameron and Emily Young, the latter a former wrestler before doing para-Nordic skiing.

Men

Women

Relay

Para ice hockey

Canada automatically qualified to participated in the Games after placing in the top 5 at the 2017 World Para Ice Hockey Championships in South Korea. On 11 February 2018, Hockey Canada announced the 17 players nominated for the sledge hockey team, selected and headed by coach Ken Babey.

Summary

Roster
Head coach:  Ken Babey     Assistant coaches:  Danny Lynch,  Luke Pierce

Preliminary round

Semifinal

Gold medal game

Snowboarding

On 21 February 2018, Canada Snowboard announced the nominations of 7 athletes (five men and two women) to Team Canada.

Banked slalom

Cross

Qualification legend: FA – Qualify to medal round; FB – Qualify to consolation round

Wheelchair curling

On 8 December 2017, Curling Canada announced the nominations of 5 athletes (three men and two women) to Team Canada.

Summary

Round robin
Canada has a bye in draws 3, 5, 7, 10, 12 and 17.

Draw 1
Saturday, 10 March, 14:35

Draw 2
Saturday, 10 March, 19:35

Draw 4
Sunday, 11 March, 14:35

Draw 6
Monday, 12 March, 09:35

Draw 8
Monday, 12 March, 19:35

Draw 9
Tuesday, 13 March, 09:35

Draw 11
Tuesday, 13 March, 19:35

Draw 13
Wednesday, 14 March, 14:35

Draw 14
Wednesday, 14 March, 19:35

Draw 15
Thursday, 15 March, 09:35

Draw 16
Thursday, 15 March, 14:35

Semifinal
Friday, 16 March, 15:35

Bronze medal game
Saturday, 17 March, 09:35

See also
Canada at the Paralympics
Canada at the 2018 Winter Olympics

References

Nations at the 2018 Winter Paralympics
2018
Winter Paralympics